Fee-Charging Employment Agencies Convention, 1933 (shelved) is  an International Labour Organization Convention.

It was established in 1933:
Having decided upon the adoption of certain proposals with regard to fee-charging employment agencies,...

Modification 
The concepts included in the convention were revised and included in ILO Convention C96, Fee-Charging Employment Agencies Convention (Revised), 1949.

Ratifications
Prior to its shelving, this convention had been ratified by 11 states.

External links 
Text.
Ratifications.

Employment agencies
Shelved International Labour Organization conventions
Treaties concluded in 1933
Treaties entered into force in 1936